Francis Kurkdjian (born 14 May 1969) is a French perfumer and businessman of Armenian descent. He is best known for creating the men's fragrance Le Male for Jean Paul Gaultier in 1995, which has become one of the world's best-selling perfumes. He has since created a further 40 fragrances for major companies worldwide, including Elie Saab Le Parfum for Elie Saab; My Burberry for Burberry; L'extase for Nina Ricci; and Narciso Rodriguez for Her for Narciso Rodriguez, Green Tea for Elizabeth Arden.

Kurkdjian co-founded the fragrance house Maison Francis Kurkdjian with Lebanese-French businessman and former Ernst & Young partner Marc Chaya, which has become a niche brand in the fragrance industry. He was the winner of the Prix François Coty in 2001 for his lifetime achievement.

Early life 
Francis Kurkdjian was born in Paris, France on 14 May 1969 to Armenian parents. Having been exposed to music and dancing at a young age, Francis Kurkdjian wanted to be a ballet dancer during his youth. However, he failed passing the competition to study at the Paris Opera School of Dance in 1983. Kurkdjian, who already had an interest in perfume making since he was thirteen years old, decided in 1985 to become a perfumer. In 1990, Kurkdjian entered the Institut Supérieur International du Parfum, de la Cosmétique et de l'Aromatique Alimentaire (ISIPCA), a perfume school located in Versailles, France. He graduated from ISIPCA in 1993 and joined Quest International in Paris the same year. Kurkdjian continued his studies and obtained a master's degree from the Paris Institute of Luxury Marketing.

Career 
In 1995, at the age of twenty-six, Kurkdjian created Le Male for Jean Paul Gaultier, one of the world's best selling perfumes. This became Kurkdjian's first success at perfume making. This was followed by more than 40 creations for major fashion designers and houses.

Besides selling his scents to major fashion designers and houses in the beginning of his new career, Kurkdjian opened the pathways to a new vision, lending his talent to contemporary artists, re-creating Marie Antoinette’s favorite perfume for Palace of Versailles, going back in time to the early 17th century and the sources of perfumery.

Kurkdjian has also created gigantic olfactory installations in emblematic spaces, making people dream with his ephemeral and spectacular perfumed performances and was honoured the "Chevalier des Arts et des Lettres" by French Government in 2008.

He was the first to open his bespoke fragrances atelier in 2001, going against the trend of perfume democratization.

In 2006, Kurkdjian redeveloped the Papier d'Arménie for the year of Armenia in France. Papier d'Arménie, a type of Armenian paper produced in France, is a room deodorizing product sold as booklets of twelve sheets of paper each cut into three pieces, which are coated with benzoin resin, the dried sap of styrax trees.

He co-founded his own fragrance house Maison Francis Kurkdjian with business partner Marc Chaya in 2009 near the Place Vendôme in Paris. The Maison Francis Kurkdjian is now a major player in the niche luxury fragrance segment with more than 300 locations worldwide.

On October 2021, Christian Dior appointed Kurkdjian as its new creative director of perfume.

Awards and recognition 
Among Kurkdjian's awards include:
 Winner of the François Coty perfumer (Oct 2001)
 Award for the collective body of his creative work
 Cosmetique Magazine's best perfumer of year 2008
 Named Chevalier of Arts and Letters (July 2008)
 WWD Beauty Biz Award, Maison Francis Kurkdjian
 Breakthrough product of the year Fine Fragrance (2009)
 Cosmetique Magazine's best niche mixte perfume for Aqua Universalis (June 2010)

List of creations

Artistic collaborations 
Voir et être vu, Grand Palais Paris 2015/2016 - olfactive installation for the Elisabeth Louise Vigée Le Brun exhibition
Milan world expo 2015, Stratus 2015 - olfactive installation for Pavillon Lille 3000
L'Art du Jardin, Grand Palais Paris, Flora Tournicota, 2013
Chateau de Versailles, Sillage De La Reine - Re-creation of the scent of Queen Marie Antoinette, 2006
Olfactive installations in the gardens of Versailles: Bosquet de l'orangerie, 2006 - PréamBulles, Bosquet des 3 fontaines, Bosquet de la Rocaille, 2007 and 2008
Grand Palais, NoctamBulles: olfactive installation during the 2010 Paris great museum evening
Shanghai expo 2010: Olfactive installation at the French Pavilion
La Luce Degli Innocenti: Olfactive installation, Florence 2011
Sophie Calle: The smell of Money, 2003
Paris Garnier Opera: Pas de deux, eau de parfum, 2004

References

External links 
Maison Francis Kurkdjian
YouTube
MAXAROMA.COM

1969 births
Living people
French chief executives
French people of Armenian descent
French perfumers